Just Friends is a vocal jazz album by Rick Haydon and John Pizzarelli, released in February 2006 with Mel Bay Records.

It reached 19 on the JazzWeek Top 100 charts in April 2006.

Reception

Mike Shanley for the JazzTimes wrote that technically "both guitarists play Bill Moll seven-string axes, so it would’ve been nice if this album did a better job of distinguishing one from the other" but that "their musical touchstones and graceful styles blend together like a seasoned team."

Ken Dryden at All About Jazz had a more positive take, writing the duo alternates "between lead and rhythm lines so effectively that it's hard to tell who is who." He concluded "it is obvious that they had a ball making this disc."

Scott Yanow rated the album four stars on AllMusic, commenting that Haydon "holds his own with Pizzarelli on this good-natured and consistently swinging quartet set."

Track listing

Personnel
 Rick Haydon7-string electric guitar
 John Pizzarelli7-string electric guitar
 Martin Pizzarellibass
 Tony Tedescodrums

References

External links
 

2006 albums
John Pizzarelli albums
Collaborative albums